The National League pennant winner of a given Major League Baseball season is the team that wins the championship—the pennant—of MLB's National League (NL). This team receives the Warren C. Giles Trophy and the right to play in the World Series against the champion of the American League (AL). The current NL pennant winners are the Philadelphia Phillies, who beat out the San Diego Padres to win the NL pennant in October 2022.

The trophy is named for Warren Giles, the league president from 1951 to 1969, and is presented immediately after each NL Championship Series (NLCS) by Warren's son Bill Giles, the honorary league president and owner of the Philadelphia Phillies.

From 1876 through 1968, the pennant was awarded to the team with the best regular-season record.  Beginning in 1969, the league was divided into East and West divisions, with the champions of each playing for the pennant in the League Championship Series (NLCS). Since 1995, there have been three divisions and a two-round playoff bracket which begins with two Division Series (NLDS).

The pennant has been awarded every year since 1876, except for 1994, when a players' strike forced the cancellation of the postseason. Until 1969, the pennant was presented to the team with the best win–loss record at the end of the season. In 1969, the league split into two divisions, and the teams with the best records in each division played one another in the NLCS to determine the pennant winner. The format of the NLCS was changed from a best-of-five to a best-of-seven format for the 1985 postseason. In 1995, an additional playoff series was added when MLB restructured the two divisions in each league into three. , the winners of the Eastern, Central, and Western Divisions, as well as one wild card team, play in the NL Division Series, a best-of-five playoff to determine the opponents who will play for the pennant.

By pennants, the Los Angeles Dodgers (formerly the Brooklyn Dodgers; 24 pennants, 31 playoff appearances) are the winningest team in NL history.  The San Francisco Giants (formerly the New York Giants; 23 pennants, 27 playoff appearances) are in second place, with the St. Louis Cardinals (19 pennants and 28 playoff appearances), in third place, followed by the Atlanta Braves (18 pennants and 23 postseason appearances between their three home cities of Atlanta, Milwaukee, and Boston) in fourth place and the Chicago Cubs (17 pennants and 20 playoff appearances as the Cubs and White Stockings) in fifth. The Philadelphia Phillies were NL champions in back-to-back seasons in 2008 and 2009, becoming the first NL team to do so since the Braves in 1995 and 1996. The Dodgers were also league champions in back-to-back seasons in 2017 and 2018. The modern World Series began in 1903, when the National League recognized the upstart American League, founded in 1901. There was an earlier "World's Championship Series" played between the pennant winners of the NL and the American Association 1884–1890; from 1894 to 1897 the NL's first- and second-place teams played a postseason series for the Temple Cup, which was considered to be the league championship. As of 2021, the Dodgers have the most modern-era World Series appearances at 21, followed by the San Francisco Giants with 20.

The team with the best record to win the NL pennant was the 1906 Cubs, who won 116 of 152 games during that season and finished 20 games ahead of the New York Giants. The best record by a pennant winner in the Championship Series era is 108–54, which was achieved by the Cincinnati Reds in 1975 and the New York Mets in 1986; both of these teams went on to win the World Series.

NL champions have gone on to win the World Series 51 times, most recently in 2021. Pennant winners have also won the Temple Cup and the Chronicle-Telegraph Cup, two pre-World Series league championships, although second-place teams won three of the four Temple Cup meetings. The largest margin of victory for a pennant winner, before the league split into two divisions in 1969, is  games; the Pittsburgh Pirates led the Brooklyn Superbas (now the Dodgers) by that margin on the final day of the 1902 season.

The only currently existing National League franchise to have never won an NL pennant are the Milwaukee Brewers; however, they did win a pennant during their time in the American League.

Key

Single table era (1876–1968)

League Championship Series era (1969–present)

Notes
 A mid-season labor stoppage split the season into two halves. The winner of the first half played the winner of the second half in each division in the 1981 National League Division Series. The winners played in the 1981 NLCS for the National League pennant.
 The leagues were re-aligned in 1994 to three divisions and a wild card was added to the playoffs, but the labor stoppage cancelled the postseason. Wild cards were first used in the 1995 playoffs.

NL pennants won by franchise

Italics represent a franchise that is defunct in Major League Baseball as of the 2022 season.

Notes
 Previously known as Brooklyn Dodgers, Brooklyn Robins, Brooklyn Superbas, Brooklyn Bridegrooms, Brooklyn Grooms, Brooklyn Grays and Brooklyn Atlantics. Does not include American Association pennant won in 1889
 Previously known as New York Giants and New York Gothams
 Previously known as St. Louis Perfectos, St. Louis Browns, and St. Louis Brown Stockings. Does not include four American Association pennants won in 1885–1888
 Previously known as Milwaukee Braves, Boston Braves, Boston Bees, Boston Rustlers, Boston Doves, Boston Beaneaters and Boston Red Caps
 Previously known as Chicago Orphans, Chicago Colts and Chicago White Stockings
 Previously known as Pittsburgh Alleghenys
 Previously known as Cincinnati Redlegs and Cincinnati Red Stockings. Does not include American Association pennant won in 1882
 Previously known as Philadelphia Quakers and unofficially as Philadelphia Blue Jays
 The 19th-century Baltimore Orioles who played in the National League are no longer in existence; two current American League franchises later used the Orioles name (New York Yankees and Baltimore Orioles).
 Previously known as Houston Colt .45s Does not include four American League pennants.
 Previously known as Montreal Expos. In 1994, the Expos led the National League East and had the best win–loss record in the league when the season was cut short by a labor dispute.
 The Brewers were members of the American League through the 1997 season after which they switched to the National League. This table records only the Brewers' National League accomplishments. They won the American League pennant in 1982.

See also

American League Championship Series – the American League counterpart to the NLCS
List of American League pennant winners
National League Division Series – has preceded this series since 1994

References

General

Inline citations

External links
Official League Championship Series Overview from Major League Baseball

Major League Baseball postseason
National League
National League